Tenaturris gemma is a species of sea snail, a marine gastropod mollusk in the family Mangeliidae.

Description

Distribution

References

gemma
Gastropods described in 1884